Olavi Litmanen (born 17 April 1945) is a Finnish former international footballer who played as a forward. He spent his career with Reipas Lahti in Mestaruussarja and Lahden Palloseura in lower divisions.

He won 5 Finnish Cup winners' medals with Reipas, 1964, 1972, 1973, 1974 and 1978.

Personal life
Litmanen married a player of the Reipas women's team. He is the father of the Finnish international footballer Jari Olavi Litmanen who also began his career with Reipas.

References

1945 births
Living people
People from Parikkala
Finnish footballers
Association football forwards
Finland international footballers
Sportspeople from South Karelia